Abel Costas Montaño (May 25, 1920 – February 11, 2015) was a Bolivian prelate of the Roman Catholic Church.

Costas Montaño was born in Pocona, Bolivia and was ordained a priest on September 22, 1945. He was appointed auxiliary archbishop of the Archdiocese of Cochabamba on November 11, 1968, as well as titular bishop of Novi, and was ordained bishop on January 6, 1969. Montaño was appointed Bishop of the Diocese of Tarija on December 11, 1974, where he would serve until his retirement on October 20, 1995.

External links
Catholic-Hierarchy

1920 births
2015 deaths
20th-century Roman Catholic bishops in Bolivia
Bolivian Roman Catholic bishops
Roman Catholic bishops of Cochabamba
Roman Catholic bishops of Tarija